Lolagi Visinia (born 17 January 1993) is a rugby union player, who currently plays as a wing or fullback for  in Super Rugby and  in New Zealand's domestic National Provincial Championship competition. He was born and raised in New Zealand, but has represented both New Zealand (in sevens) and Manu Samoa internationally.

Early career 

Visinia attended Kelston Boys' High School, where he turned out for the school's first XV. Although Kelston Boys 1st XV didn't win the Auckland competition in 2011, Visinia helped his team win their first National Top 4 title in 12 years. He scored a try in the 24 – 14 win over Wesley College in the Final. Later that year, Visinia also played for the Kelston Boys' sevens team that won the Condor Sevens, an annual Secondary School Sevens tournament in New Zealand.

Senior career 

On 14 August 2012, at the age of 19, Visinia was named in the  ITM Cup squad, for the first time. He made his provincial debut – off the bench – on 2 September 2012 against  and his starting debut on 7 October 2012 against . He scored his first try for Auckland on 27 October 2012 against  in the 2011 ITM Cup Premiership Final that Auckland lost 18 – 31.

It was his only Super Rugby game that season, but he was named in the Blues squad for 2014.

Visinia spent four seasons at the Blues, before signing with French club Grenoble in November 2016. At the end of the 2017–18 Rugby Pro D2 season, his first with the club, Grenoble secured promotion to the Top 14 after winning a promotion/relegation match 47–22 against Oyonnax. Visinia scored two tries in that game. However, after the 2018–19 Top 14 season, Grenoble was relegated back to the Pro D2 after losing a promotion/relegation match 22 -28 against Brive. It turned out to be Visinia's last season with the club.

On 3 June 2019, Japanese club NEC Green Rockets announced the signing of Visinia. He made his debut for the club on 22 June 2019 against Mazda Blue Zoomers, scoring 2 tries on debut. He played a total of 10 games (scoring 5 tries) for the Green Rockets; five games for the 2019 Top League Cup and five Top League games. The 2020 Top League season was cancelled after round 6 due to the COVID-19 pandemic and Visinia returned to New Zealand.

In July 2020, it was announced that Visinia would join  for the Mitre 10 Cup. He made his debut for the Magpies – off the bench – against  on 13 September 2020. A week later he was named in the starting line-up against  and scored his first try for the Magpies in that game. He went on to play 11 games – in which he scored 5 tries – in his first season for Hawke's Bay, helping the Magpies win the 2020 Mitre 10 Cup Championship title and the Ranfurly Shield. At the end of the season, he was named the Magpies' Rookie of the Year.

On 2 December 2020, Visinia was named in the  squad for the 2021 Super Rugby season.

On 26 October 2021, Moana Pasifika announced that it had signed Visinia for the 2022 Super Rugby Pacific season.

International career 

After a successful 1st XV season with Kelston Boys' High School, Visinia was named in the 2011 New Zealand Secondary Schools team that played matches against Australian Schools and Australian Schools 'A'.

Fresh out of school, at the age of 19, he was part of the 2012 New Zealand Sevens squad. He played in the Hong Kong and Japan rounds of the 2011–12 IRB Sevens World Series.

A year later, Visinia was named in the New Zealand Under-20 squad for the 2013 IRB Junior World Championship. He played in 4 games and scored 4 tries during the tournament.

As a result of a change in international eligibility rules – adopted by World Rugby on 24 November 2021 – which allows captured players to change to a new country once, provided they or their (grand)parents were born in the new country, Visinia – who is of Samoan descent – was able to play for Manu Samoa despite having represented New Zealand in sevens. On 2 June 2022, he was named in the Manu Samoa squad for the first time. He made his international debut for Samoa on 2 July 2022 against Australia A in their first game of the 2022 Pacific Nations Cup, which they won 31–26.

See also
 International rugby union eligibility rules

References

External links 
 

1993 births
Living people
New Zealand people of I-Taukei Fijian descent
New Zealand sportspeople of Samoan descent
People educated at Kelston Boys' High School
New Zealand rugby union players
New Zealand male rugby sevens players
New Zealand international rugby sevens players
Samoan rugby union players
Samoa international rugby union players
Rugby union players from Auckland
Rugby union wings
Rugby union fullbacks
Auckland rugby union players
Blues (Super Rugby) players
FC Grenoble players
Hawke's Bay rugby union players
Green Rockets Tokatsu players
Hurricanes (rugby union) players
Moana Pasifika players